Megarthria is a genus of snout moths described by Émile Louis Ragonot in 1893.

Species
Megarthria peterseni (Zeller, 1881)

References

Phycitinae
Pyralidae genera
Taxa named by Émile Louis Ragonot